The Shasta salamander (Hydromantes shastae) is a species of salamander in the family Plethodontidae. It is endemic to Shasta County in California.

Taxonomy 
Formerly considered to be a single species with a rather small distribution in the vicinity of Shasta Lake, a 2018 study found it to comprise three species, including H. shastae sensu stricto, and two new species: the Samwel Shasta salamander (H. samweli), found in the north-central and northwest sides of the lake, and the Wintu Shasta salamander (H. wintu) on the northern shore of the lake near the McCloud River. Both species are physically similar to H. shastae and can only be distinguished by range and genetics.

Distribution and habitat 
It is found in the Cascade Range in areas around Shasta Lake with limestone substrate, primarily between Squaw Creek and the Pit River, but also on the south side of Shasta Lake and in the vicinity of Ingot. Its natural habitats are temperate forests, freshwater springs, rocky areas, and caves.

Threats 
Its small distribution was likely fragmented by the creation of the lake and the construction of the Shasta Dam. Proposals to raise the water levels of the lake would likely flood more habitats and further threaten it. In addition, the splitting of this species into three distinct species with highly restricted ranges likely makes it even more endangered previously thought. However, in 2021 the U.S. Fish and Wildlife Service found the species to not warrant Endangered Species Act protections.

References

Amphibians of the United States
Hydromantes
Endemic fauna of California
Amphibians described in 1953
Taxonomy articles created by Polbot